Shot is a 2017 American drama film directed by Jeremy Kagan and starring Noah Wyle, Sharon Leal and Jorge Lendeborg Jr.

Cast
Noah Wyle as Mark Newman
Sharon Leal as Phoebe
Jorge Lendeborg Jr. as Miguel
Xander Berkeley as Dr. Roberts
Elaine Hendrix as Nurse Marci
Malcolm-Jamal Warner as EMT Jones
Joy Osmanski as Nurse Samantha
Eve Kagan as Nurse Gina
Dominic Colón as Garcia
Tommy Day Carey as Turner
Rafael Cebrián as Juan
Brad Lee Wind as Anderson
Sarah Clarke as Dr. Fisher

Reception
The film has a 50% rating on Rotten Tomatoes.

Rich Cline of Contactmusic.com gave the film three and a half stars out of five. Gary Goldstein of the Los Angeles Times enjoyed the film, writing that "...it's the fine acting and the film's plea for sensible gun control that carry the day." Alan Zilberman of The Washington Post gave the film a negative review and wrote, "Despite flashes of brilliance, strong performances and innovative camera techniques, the film never rises above the schmaltz of an after-school special."

References

External links
 
 

American drama films
Films directed by Jeremy Kagan
Films scored by Bruce Broughton
2010s English-language films
2010s American films
Works about gun politics in the United States